Kangaroo Flat is a suburb of Bendigo in Victoria, Australia. It is located 5 kilometres (3 miles) South-West of the Bendigo CBD. Kangaroo Flat is neighbours with Golden Square, Big Hill, Lockwood, Maiden Gully and Mandurang. Kangaroo Flat derived its name from the large "mobs" (groups) of Eastern Grey Kangaroos encountered around gold miners' campsites and in the vast bush (forest) landscapes around Bendigo.

History

Prior to the gold rush the Bendigo (called Sandhurst, in those days) district was part of a large sheep station known as "the Ravenswood Run". Discovery of gold deposits in the 1850s brought many miners to the region, looking to seek their fortune. People came from a number of overseas countries, such as England, Netherlands, Ireland, The United States of America, Germany and others.  Large numbers came from Mainland China. Chinese miners conducted searches of alluvial (surface level) and shallow mine-sites. Characteristically "round" Chinese digs are still able to be viewed in places such as Charcoal Gully, a bushland reserve located between Morrison and Thomas Streets to the southwest of Kangaroo Flat's town centre. This Chinese influence was at first resented by other diggers, many who came from European countries with little or no understanding of the Asian lifestyle. Concerted efforts by Chinese settlers to assist their adopted communities led to their being eventually embraced in the district.

Bendigo and satellite towns, including Kangaroo Flat, Golden Square, Eaglehawk and White Hills, sprung up essentially as tent cities. These gave way to more permanent structures and the current street layout was established by the 1880s. The Post Office opened on 2 February 1857.

The population of Kangaroo Flat itself decreased along with the rest of the "Sandhurst" region as the gold rush subsided, although the town has always maintained its own cultural heritage and identity.  Kangaroo Flat is home to the Crusoe Reservoir, built during the gold rush to supply water to Bendigo's goldfields. Water for the reservoir came from a series of channels reaching as far south as Kyneton. Crusoe's filtration system included a lime/sand-based installation. The reservoir is open today as a recreation park and swimming beach.

At November 2016, with the town's population approaching 12,000 residents, local facilities have been upgraded to keep pace with community needs.

Dower Park, Kangaroo Flat's principal sporting complex and home to the local football, cricket, bowling & swimming clubs, has been remodelled. A sports club with restaurant & gaming facilities was completed in recent years, as was a new grandstand on the Western side of the oval. An indoor aquatic center has been constructed in Browning Street while a new Ambulance Station operates in View Street. The Kangaroo Flat Fire Brigade was established in 1873 and initially operated out of a wooden station in Smith Street. The Brigade was established and equipped with funds donated from within the community. The Brigade moved to a new premise in Station Street in 1956 in part to facilitate a second fire fighting appliance (tanker). It has now relocated to a new site in Helm Street, adjacent to Charcoal Gully. The new fire station houses four firefighting appliances and facilities for its volunteer fire fighters. The Brigade will celebrate its 150th anniversary in 2023. The Country Fire Authority's District 2 Headquarters have been relocated, from their former site atop Bendigo's Fire Station, to the site of the old Don Murray's Windermere Hotel, at the intersection of Lockwood Road and Helm Street.

A number of old churches, built in the mid-1800s, give testimony to a well-established community with strong British ties. St. Monica's Roman Catholic Church sits at the Northern end of Kangaroo Flat's busy "Main" business & shopping street, striking red brick & white masonry trim creating a unique landmark. Its newly modernised Catholic primary school is located directly opposite on the corner of Station Street. The Kangaroo Flat Uniting Church, (formerly Methodist) occupies a similar prominent spot on the Southern approach to the main street. Standing in an elevated position in Camp Street, it looks west towards Lockwood Road and the town's famous farming district. The Kangaroo Flat Baptist Church is to be found in Church Street, just a short stroll from Camp Street. Formerly the Kangaroo Flat Presbyterian Church, it has a long & proud history in the local area.

St. Mary's Anglican Church, is situated further along Melbourne Road from the Uniting Church. A part of Kangaroo Flat since gold rush times, the original church was destroyed by a horrific fire in December 2008. Constructed around 1862, the main building had housed stone & timber tablets paying tribute to community members. A Flight Sergeant killed over England during the Second World War, a much-loved resident Minister, & a young girl from the parish flock; these & others commemorated on St. Mary's walls reinforced the importance of community itself within the church. A large oil painting in modern style, completed in the 1950s by Anne Moller, a young local girl, depicted the birth, crucifixion & resurrection of Jesus Christ. It formed a thematic above the altar, but was lost in the fire along with nearly all of the Parish's history.  The church and community rallied to raise funds, and in mid-2014 a new, modern facility was opened where the original building had stood. It features a modern church and facilities with which to serve the parish & community well into the future.

Kangaroo Flat itself has grown from its early beginnings. The 4-lane Calder Highway carries thousands of vehicles daily on a 90-minute trip to the nearby Victorian capital city of Melbourne and suburbs. Three shopping precincts cater to the growing demographic, and a restored and upgraded railway station allows commuters access to the V/Line Fast Train system linking Bendigo to Melbourne and other urban districts.

Economy
The suburb has one shopping centre, Lansell Square, which is located on the Calder Highway to the south of the Kangaroo Flat main CBD. It was opened in 1979 with a K-Mart department store, Coles and Safeway (now known as Woolworths) supermarkets, in addition to 55 specialty stores. The centre received a development upgrade between 2014 and 2015.

Public services

Education
Kangaroo Flat is home to the Kangaroos Football and Netball team in the Bendigo Football League, and a number of educational institutions; Crusoe Secondary College, Kangaroo Flat Primary School, St. Monica's Primary School, the Bendigo campus of Glenvale Primary School and Bendigo Special Development School.

References

Suburbs of Bendigo
Bendigo